Josh Nicholls (born April 27, 1992) is a Canadian professional ice hockey  right wing who currently plays for the Kunlun Red Star of the Kontinental Hockey League (KHL). He was drafted by the Toronto Maple Leafs in the 7th round, 182nd overall of the 2010 NHL Entry Draft.

Career statistics

Regular season and playoffs

International

References

External links

1992 births
Living people
Canadian ice hockey right wingers
Colorado Eagles players
Greenville Road Warriors players
Greenville Swamp Rabbits players
Hartford Wolf Pack players
HC Kunlun Red Star players
HC Litvínov players
Heilbronner Falken players
Saskatoon Blades players
Storhamar Dragons players
Straubing Tigers players
Toronto Maple Leafs draft picks
People from Delta, British Columbia
Ice hockey people from British Columbia
Canadian expatriate ice hockey players in the United States
Canadian expatriate ice hockey players in the Czech Republic
Canadian expatriate ice hockey players in Germany
Canadian expatriate ice hockey players in Norway
Canadian expatriate ice hockey players in China
Naturalized citizens of the People's Republic of China